Maximilianus "Max" van der Stoel (3 August 1924 – 23 April 2011) was a Dutch politician and diplomat, member of the Labour Party (PvdA) and activist who served as High Commissioner on National Minorities of the OSCE from 1 January 1993 until 1 July 2001.

Van der Stoel studied Law at the Leiden University obtaining a Master of Laws degree followed by a postgraduate education in Sociology at his alma mater obtaining a Master of Social Science degree. Van der Stoel worked as a researcher at the Wiardi Beckman Foundation from April 1953 until August 1958 and for the Labour Party party board from June 1958 until July 1965. After the Senate election of 1960 Van der Stoel was elected as a Member of the Senate on 27 September 1960 serving as a frontbencher and spokesperson for Foreign Affairs. After the election of 1963 Van der Stoel was elected as a member of the House of Representatives on 5 June 1963 and served as a frontbencher and spokesperson for Foreign Affairs. Van der Stoel was appointed as State Secretary for Foreign Affairs in the Cabinet Cals taking office on 22 July 1965. The Cabinet Cals fell just one year into its term after a major political crisis and was replaced on 22 November 1966. After the election of 1967 Van der Stoel returned to the House of House of Representatives on 23 February 1967 and again served as a frontbencher and spokesperson for Foreign Affairs. After the election of 1972 Van der Stoel was appointed as Minister of Foreign Affairs in the Cabinet Den Uyl, taking office on 11 May 1973. The Cabinet Den Uyl fell just before the end of its term. After the election of 1977 Van der Stoel returned to the House of Representatives serving from 8 June 1977 until 8 September 1977 and again from 16 January 1978 serving as a frontbencher chairing the House Committee on Foreign Affairs and spokesperson for European Affairs. After the election of 1981 Van der Stoel was appointed again as Minister of Foreign Affairs in the Cabinet Van Agt II taking office on 11 September 1981. The Cabinet Van Agt II fell just seven months into its term and was replaced with the caretaker Cabinet Van Agt III on 29 May 1982. Shortly thereafter Van der Stoel announced that he wouldn't stand for the election of 1982.

Van der Stoel continued to be active in politics and in June 1983 he was nominated as the next Ambassador to the United Nations serving from 1 July 1983 until 1 August 1986 when he was appointed as a Member of the Council of State serving until 1 January 1993. In December 1992 Van der Stoel was nominated as the first High Commissioner on National Minorities of the OSCE serving from 1 January 1993 until 1 July 2001. Van der Stoel also became active as a diplomat for the United Nations, serving as an expert on Human rights.

Van der Stoel retired from active politics at 76 and became active in the public sector as a non-profit director and served on several state commissions and councils on behalf of the government and as an occasional diplomat for and diplomatic delegations, and worked as a distinguished professor of Peace and conflict studies, Minority rights and International relations at his alma mater from April 1999 until April 2000 and as distinguished visiting professor of International and European law at the Tilburg University from January 2001 until January 2003. Following his retirement Van der Stoel continued to be active as an advocate and activist for the Human rights and Minority rights. Van der Stoel was known for his abilities as a skillful negotiator and effective mediator. Van der Stoel was granted the honorary title of Minister of State on 17 May 1991 and continued to comment on political affairs until his death in April 2011 at the age of 86.

Biography

Early life and career

Van der Stoel attended the Gymnasium Leiden from June 1937 until June 1943, and applied at the Leiden University in June 1943 majoring in Law and obtaining an Bachelor of Laws degree in December 1945 before graduating with a Master of Laws degree in July 1947. Van der Stoel continued to study at the Leiden University for a postgraduate education in Sociology and worked as a student researcher before obtaining an Bachelor of Social Science degree June 1947 and an Master of Social Science degree in July 1953. Van der Stoel worked as a researcher for the Wiardi Beckman Foundation, the scientific bureau of the Partij van de Arbeid (PvdA, the Dutch labour party), from August 1953 until April 1958 and as a political consultant for the Labour Party from April 1958 until July 1965.

Van der Stoel was elected as a Member of the Senate following the Senate election of 1960, serving from 27 September 1960 until 5 June 1963. That year, he became international secretary for the PvdA .

Politics
From 1973 to 1977 and 1981 to 1982 he was the Netherlands Minister of Foreign Affairs. In 1977, during his visit to communist Czechoslovakia, he met with philosopher and dissident Jan Patočka, and they discussed Charter 77 and human rights in Czechoslovakia. This provoked harsh criticism by the Czechoslovak authorities and president Gustáv Husák cancelled scheduled meeting with van der Stoel.

In 2001, following his intervention as High Commissioner in the ongoing problem of equitable access to higher education by members of the Albanian ethnic group in the Republic of Macedonia,  he became the founding President of the International Foundation for the South East European University, raising some 35m Euros from the international community. He later served as President of the University Board until 2004. He was awarded the University's first honorary Doctorate and the University named its Library and its Research Institute in his honour.

Van der Stoel was a member of the Advisory Board of the European Association of History Educators (EUROCLIO).

Freedom awards
Freedom of Speech of the Four Freedoms Award (1982)
Helène de Montigny award (December 1991)
Dr. J.P. van Praag award (1 June 1993, Netherlands)
Geuzenpenning (1993, Netherlands)
Wateler Peace award (30 oktober 1996)

Honorary degrees
Honorary doctorate in Law, University of Athens (1977, Greece)
Honorary doctorate in Law, Utrecht University (1994, Netherlands)
Honorary doctorate in Law, Pázmány Péter Catholic University (1999, Hungary)
Honorary Doctor, South East European University (2005, Republic of Macedonia)

Other
In 2014, a new park in Prague (in Jan Patočka street) was named in van der Stoel's honour. In 2017, forty years after his meeting with Jan Patočka, Van der Stoel's memorial created by Dominik Lang was unveiled in the park.

Decorations

Honorary degrees

Notes

References

External links

Official
  Dr. M. (Max) van der Stoel Parlement & Politiek
  Mr. M. van der Stoel (PvdA) Eerste Kamer der Staten-Generaal

 

 

 
 

 
 

1924 births
2011 deaths
Dutch agnostics
Dutch anti-war activists
Dutch democracy activists
Dutch expatriates in Austria
Dutch expatriates in Belgium
Dutch expatriates in Switzerland
Dutch expatriates in the United States
Dutch humanists
Dutch humanitarians
Dutch human rights activists
Dutch nonprofit directors
Dutch nonprofit executives
Dutch officials of the European Union
European Union law scholars
European Union lobbyists
Foreign policy writers
Grand Crosses of the Order of the Crown (Belgium)
Grand Crosses of the Order of the Phoenix (Greece)
Grand Crosses of the Order of Merit (Portugal)
Grand Crosses 1st class of the Order of Merit of the Federal Republic of Germany
Grand Officiers of the Légion d'honneur
Grand Officers of the Order of Orange-Nassau
Honorary Knights Grand Cross of the Order of St Michael and St George
International law scholars
Dutch international relations scholars
Knights Grand Cross of the Order of Isabella the Catholic
Knights of the Order of the Netherlands Lion
Labour Party (Netherlands) MEPs
Labour Party (Netherlands) politicians
Leiden University alumni
Members of the Council of State (Netherlands)
Members of the House of Representatives (Netherlands)
Members of the Senate (Netherlands)
Members of the Royal Netherlands Academy of Arts and Sciences
MEPs for the Netherlands 1958–1979
Ministers of Foreign Affairs of the Netherlands
Ministers of State (Netherlands)
Organization for Security and Co-operation in Europe
Peace and conflict scholars
People from Voorschoten
Diplomats from The Hague
People of the Velvet Revolution
Permanent Representatives of the Netherlands to the United Nations
Political realists
Recipients of the Order of the House of Orange
Recipients of the Order of Tomáš Garrigue Masaryk
Recipients of the Four Freedoms Award
Recipients of the Order of Prince Yaroslav the Wise, 4th class
State Secretaries for Foreign Affairs of the Netherlands
Academic staff of Tilburg University
Writers about activism and social change
Writers about communism
20th-century Dutch diplomats
20th-century Dutch educators
20th-century Dutch jurists
20th-century Dutch male writers
20th-century Dutch politicians